The North Broad Street Historic District in Monroe, Georgia is a  historic district which was listed on the National Register of Historic Places in 1983.  The listing included 56 contributing buildings.

It includes the Davis Edwards House, which is separately listed on the National Register.

References

Historic districts on the National Register of Historic Places in Georgia (U.S. state)
National Register of Historic Places in Walton County, Georgia
Victorian architecture in Georgia (U.S. state)